Euleia nigriceps is a species of tephritid or fruit flies in the genus Euleia of the family Tephritidae.

References

nigriceps